The Last Frontier is a 1926 American silent Western film directed by George B. Seitz and starring William Boyd, Marguerite De La Motte, and Jack Hoxie.  The plot of this film was later reused in the 1948 Columbia Pictures serial Tex Granger.

Cast

Preservation
A print of The Last Frontier is preserved in Archives Du Film Du CNC, Bois d'Arcy.

References

External links

 
 
 
 Lobby card at Getty Images

1926 films
1926 Western (genre) films
Films directed by George B. Seitz
American black-and-white films
Producers Distributing Corporation films
Silent American Western (genre) films
1920s American films
1920s English-language films